Starry Gazey Pie is the 2004 debut album from the Silver Seas. Its original cover reflected the band's previous name, the Bees (U.S.), but unlike their second album, High Society (2006), Starry Gazey Pie wasn't reissued on Cheap Lullaby Records in 2007. However, on iTunes and Amazon.com the band's current name replaces the previous one on the MP3 version of the album.

Track listing
All songs written by Daniel Tashian.

"Destiny on the Lawn" – 2:31
"Starry Gazey Pie" – 4:00
"Love Is a Holiday" – 2:22
"Message From the Birds" – 2:15
"Sea of Stars" – 5:33
"It's Only Gravity" – 2:56
"Letters From the Dead" – 3:22
"Bring On the Clowns" – 3:47
"Mrs. Wilson" – 4:32
"It Was" – 2:58

Personnel
 David Gehrke: drums, vocals
 Robbie Harrington: upright bass
 Jason Lehning: piano, Juno-60, vocals
 Daniel Tashian: lead vocals, 12-string guitar

Production notes
Engineered by King Williams. Mastered by Jim DeMain at Yes Master Studios in Nashville, Tenn. Sleeve design by Carl Tashian.

References

2004 debut albums
The Silver Seas albums